Langit Lupa (Lit: Heaven Earth) is a 2016 Philippine family drama television series directed by Carlo Po Artillaga and Myla Ajero-Gaite, starring Yesha Camile and Xia Vigor. The series premiered on ABS-CBN's PrimeTanghali noontime block and worldwide on The Filipino Channel from November 28, 2016 to April 28, 2017 replacing Be My Lady.

Episodes

References

Lists of Philippine drama television series episodes